ISOHDFS 27 is a spiral galaxy in the constellation Tucana, and was discovered in the Hubble Deep Field South survey.

See also
 List of galaxies

External links
 "Massive spiral galaxy ISOHDFS 27" by the European Southern Observatory
  on SIMBAD
 

Spiral galaxies
Tucana (constellation)
Astronomical objects discovered in 2000